Robert I (Italian: Roberto Carlo Luigi Maria; 9 July 1848 – 16 November 1907) was the last sovereign Duke of Parma and Piacenza from 1854 until 1859, when the duchy was annexed to Sardinia-Piedmont during the Risorgimento. He was a member of the House of Bourbon-Parma and descended from Philip, Duke of Parma, the third son of King Philip V of Spain and Queen Elisabeth Farnese.

Early life
Born in Florence, Robert was the elder son of Charles III, Duke of Parma and Louise Marie Thérèse d'Artois, daughter of Charles Ferdinand, duc de Berry and granddaughter of King Charles X of France. He succeeded his father to the ducal throne in 1854 upon the latter's assassination, when he was only six, while his mother stood as regent.

When Robert was eleven years old, he was deposed, as Piedmontese troops annexed other Italian states, ultimately to form the Kingdom of Italy. Despite losing his throne, Robert and his family enjoyed considerable wealth, traveling in a private train of more than a dozen cars from his castles at Schwarzau am Steinfeld near Vienna, to Villa Pianore in northwest Italy, and the magnificent Château de Chambord in France.

Marriages and issue
On 5 April 1869, while in exile in Rome, he married Princess Maria Pia of Bourbon-Two Sicilies (1849–1882), daughter of King Ferdinand II of the Two Sicilies. She was his half first cousin once removed, as her father (Ferdinand II) and Robert's maternal grandmother (Princess Caroline Ferdinande of Bourbon-Two Sicilies) were half-siblings, both being children of Francis I of the Two Sicilies.

Maria Pia belonged to the deposed Royal Family of the Two Sicilies and was thus a Bourbon, like her husband. She bore him 12 children, many of whom had intellectual disabilities, before dying in childbirth:

After his first wife's death in childbirth, he remarried on 15 October 1884 to Infanta Maria Antonia of Portugal, daughter of the deposed King Miguel I of Portugal and his wife, Adelaide of Löwenstein-Wertheim-Rosenberg. Maria Antonia was his second cousin once removed, as her paternal grandmother (Charlotte of Spain) and Robert's paternal great-grandmother (Maria Luisa of Spain) were siblings, both being children of Charles IV of Spain and Maria Luisa of Parma.
She bore him another 12 children:

Death and legacy
Less than four months after Robert's death in November 1907, the Grand Marshal of the Austrian court declared six of the children of his first marriage legally incompetent (they had severe intellectual disabilities), at the behest of his widow, Maria Antonia. Nonetheless, Robert's primary heir was his son Elias, the youngest son of his first marriage and the only one of his sons by that marriage to beget children of his own. Elias also became the legal guardian of his six elder siblings. While Elais was blessed with eight children, seven of whom lived to advanced age, only one of them ever married; she had three children.

The two eldest sons of Robert's second marriage, Sixte and Xavier, eventually sued their older half-brother Elias for trying to obtain a greater share of the ducal fortune. They lost in the French courts, leaving the children of Robert's second marriage with very modest wealth, and the need to earn a living; some of his younger sons served in the Austrian armed forces. Nevertheless, two of the children born of the second marriage made extraordinary marriages: Felix married the grand-duchess of Luxembourg shortly after her accession and is the grandfather of the present duke. Zita married the last Emperor of Austria; the present claimant is her grandson.

Honours
 : Grand Prefect of the Sacred Military Constantinian Order of St. George
 : Knight of the Order of the Golden Fleece, 19 January 1854
  Duchy of Modena and Reggio: Grand Cross of the Order of the Eagle of Este, 1856
 : Knight of the Order of St. Hubert, 1897
 : Grand Cross of the Ludwig Order, 9 November 1899

Ancestry

Patrilineal descent

Robert's patriline is the line from which he is descended father to son.

Patrilineal descent is the principle behind membership in royal houses, as it can be traced back through the generations - which means that if Duke Robert were to choose an historically accurate house name it would be Robert, as all his male-line ancestors have been of that house.

Robert is a member of the House of Bourbon-Parma, a sub-branch of the House of Bourbon-Spain, itself originally a branch of the House of Bourbon, and thus of the Capetian dynasty and of the Robertians.

Robert's patriline is the line from which he is descended father to son. It follows the Dukes of Parma as well as the Kings of Spain, France, and Navarre. The line can be traced back more than 1,200 years from Robert of Hesbaye to the present day, through Kings of France & Navarre, Spain and Two-Sicilies, Dukes of Parma and Grand-Dukes of Luxembourg, Princes of Orléans and Emperors of Brazil. It is one of the oldest in Europe.

Robert II of Worms and Rheingau (Robert of Hesbaye), 770 - 807
Robert III of Worms and Rheingau, 808 - 834
Robert IV the Strong, 820 - 866
Robert I of France, 866 - 923
Hugh the Great, 895 - 956
Hugh Capet, 941 - 996
Robert II of France, 972 - 1031
Henry I of France, 1008–1060
Philip I of France, 1053–1108
Louis VI of France, 1081–1137
Louis VII of France, 1120–1180
Philip II of France, 1165–1223
Louis VIII of France, 1187–1226
Louis IX of France, 1215–1270
Robert, Count of Clermont, 1256–1317
Louis I, Duke of Bourbon, 1279–1342
James I, Count of La Marche, 1319–1362
John I, Count of La Marche, 1344–1393
Louis, Count of Vendôme, 1376–1446
Jean VIII, Count of Vendôme, 1428–1478
François, Count of Vendôme, 1470–1495
Charles de Bourbon, Duke of Vendôme, 1489–1537
Antoine, King of Navarre, Duke of Vendôme, 1518–1562
Henry IV, King of France and of Navarre, 1553–1610
Louis XIII, King of France and Navarre, 1601–1643
Louis XIV, King of France and Navarre, 1638–1715
Louis, Grand Dauphin of France, 1661–1711
Philip V of Spain, 1683–1746
Philip, Duke of Parma, 1720–1765
Ferdinand, Duke of Parma, 1751–1802
Louis of Etruria, 1773–1803
Charles II, Duke of Parma, 1799–1883
Charles III, Duke of Parma, 1823–1854
Robert I, Duke of Parma, 1848–1907

See also
Duchy of Parma
List of Dukes of Parma

References

Dukes of Parma
Pretenders to the throne of Parma
Princes of Parma and Piacenza
Princes of Bourbon-Parma
House of Bourbon-Parma
1848 births
1907 deaths
Nobility from Florence
Spanish infantes
Knights of the Golden Fleece of Spain
Child pretenders
Monarchs deposed as children